Renata Mansini (born 22 August 1968) is an Italian applied mathematician, economist, and operations researcher known for her research on problems in mathematical optimization including portfolio optimization and vehicle routing. She is a professor of operations research at the University of Brescia.

Education
Mansini earned a laurea in economics and business from the University of Brescia in 1991–1992, winning a prize from the Associazione Italiana di Studio del Lavoro for the best thesis in applied mathematics. She completed a doctorate in 1996–1997 at the University of Bergamo, with the dissertation Modelli di programmazione lineare mista intera per problemi finanziari: analisi, algoritmi e risultati computazionali [mixed integer linear programming models for financial problems: analysis, algorithms, and computational results].

Book
Mansini is the co-author, with Włodzimierz Ogryczak and M. Grazia Speranza, of the book Linear and Mixed Integer Programming for Portfolio Optimization (EURO Advanced Tutorials on Operational Research, Springer, 2015).

References

External links

1968 births
Living people
Italian women engineers
Italian economists
Italian women economists
Italian women mathematicians
Applied mathematicians
Operations researchers
University of Brescia
University of Bergamo alumni